Rectitis is an inflammation of the inner rectum. It mainly affects the rectal mucous membrane.  The condition can be acute or it may be a chronic condition. Rectitis may be caused due to conditions such as ulcerative colitis or Chron's disease.

References 

Diseases and disorders